Tropical cyclones and subtropical cyclones are named by various warning centers to simplify communication between forecasters and the general public regarding forecasts, watches and warnings. The names are intended to reduce confusion in the event of concurrent storms in the same basin. Some tropical depressions are named in the Western Pacific; while tropical cyclones must contain a significant amount of gale-force winds before they are named in the Southern Hemisphere.

Before it became standard practice to give personal (first) names to tropical cyclones, they were named after places, objects, or the saints' feast days on which they occurred. Credit for the first usage of personal names for weather systems is generally given to Queensland Government Meteorologist Clement Wragge, who named systems between 1887 and 1907. When Wragge retired, the practice fell into disuse for several years until it was revived in the latter part of World War II for the Western Pacific. Formal naming schemes and lists have subsequently been used for major storms in the Eastern, Central, Western and Southern Pacific basins, and the Australian region, Atlantic Ocean and Indian Ocean.

History

Before the formal start of naming, tropical cyclones were often named after places, objects, or saints' feast days on which they occurred. The credit for the first usage of personal names for weather systems is generally given to the Queensland Government Meteorologist Clement Wragge, who named systems between 1887 and 1907. This system of naming weather systems subsequently fell into disuse for several years after Wragge retired until it was revived in the latter part of World War II for the Western Pacific. Formal naming schemes have subsequently been introduced for the North Atlantic, Eastern, Central, Western and Southern Pacific basins as well as the Australian region and Indian Ocean.

At present, tropical cyclones are officially named by one of eleven warning centers and retain their names throughout their lifetimes to facilitate the effective communication of forecasts and storm-related hazards to the general public. This is especially important when multiple storms are occurring simultaneously in the same ocean basin. However, standards vary from basin to basin, with some systems named in the Western Pacific when they develop into tropical depressions or enter PAGASA's area of responsibility. Within the Southern Hemisphere, systems must be characterized by a significant amount of gale-force winds occurring around the center before they are named.

Any member of the World Meteorological Organization's hurricane, typhoon and tropical cyclone committees can request that the name of a tropical cyclone be retired or withdrawn from the various tropical cyclone naming lists. A name is retired or withdrawn if a consensus or majority of members agree that the system has acquired a special notoriety, such as causing a large number of deaths and amounts of damage, impact, or for other special reasons. A replacement name is then submitted to the committee concerned and voted upon, but these names can be rejected and replaced with another name for various reasons: these reasons include the spelling and pronunciation of the name, the similarity to the name of a recent tropical cyclone or on another list of names, and the length of the name for modern communication channels such as social media. PAGASA also retires the names of significant tropical cyclones when they have caused at least  in damage or have caused at least 300 deaths.

North Atlantic Ocean

Within the North Atlantic Basin, tropical or subtropical storms are named by the United States National Hurricane Center (NHC/RSMC Miami), when they are judged to have 1-minute sustained winds of at least . The name selected comes from one of six rotating alphabetic lists of twenty-one names, that are maintained by the World Meteorological Organization's (WMO) RA IV Hurricane Committee. These lists skip the letters Q, U, X, Y and Z, rotate from year to year and alternate between male and female names. The names of significant tropical cyclones are retired from the lists, with a replacement name selected at the next meeting of the Hurricane Committee.

Until 2021, if all of the names on the annual name list were used, additional tropical or subtropical storms would be named with Greek letters. In March 2021, the WMO announced any additional storms will receive a name from a supplemental list, to avoid confusion caused by the Greek letter names.

Eastern and Central Pacific Ocean

Within the Eastern Pacific Ocean, there are two warning centers that assign names to tropical cyclones on behalf of the World Meteorological Organization when they are judged to have intensified into a tropical storm with winds of at least . Tropical cyclones that intensify into tropical storms between the coast of Americas and 140°W are named by the National Hurricane Center (NHC/RSMC Miami), while tropical cyclones intensifying into tropical storms between 140°W and 180° are named by the Central Pacific Hurricane Center (CPHC/RSMC Honolulu). Significant tropical cyclones have their names retired from the lists and a replacement name selected at the next World Meteorological Organization Hurricane Committee.

Eastern North Pacific (east of 140°W)
When a tropical depression intensifies into a tropical storm to the north of the Equator between the coastline of the Americas and 140°W, it will be named by the NHC. There are six lists of names which rotate every six years and begin with the letters A—Z used, skipping Q and U, with each name alternating between a male or a female name. The names of significant tropical cyclones are retired from the lists, with a replacement name selected at the next meeting of the Hurricane Committee. If all of the names on the annual name list are used, any additional tropical or subtropical storms will receive a name from a supplemental list.

Central North Pacific Ocean (140°W to 180°)

When a tropical depression intensifies into a tropical storm to the north of the Equator between 140°W and 180°, it is named by the CPHC. Four lists of Hawaiian names are maintained by the World Meteorological Organization's hurricane committee, rotating without regard to year, with the first name for a new year being the next name in sequence that was not used the previous year. The names of significant tropical cyclones are retired from the lists, with a replacement name selected at the next Hurricane Committee meeting.

Western Pacific Ocean (180° – 100°E)

Tropical cyclones that occur within the Northern Hemisphere between the anti-meridian and 100°E are officially named by the Japan Meteorological Agency when they become tropical storms. However, PAGASA also names tropical cyclones that occur or develop into tropical depressions within their self-defined area of responsibility between 5°N–25°N and 115°E–135°E. This often results in tropical cyclones in the region having two names.

International names

Tropical cyclones within the Western Pacific are assigned international names by the Japan Meteorological Agency when they become a tropical storm with 10-minute sustained winds of at least . The names are used sequentially without regard to year and are taken from five lists of names that were prepared by the ESCAP/WMO Typhoon Committee, after each of the 14 members submitted 10 names in 1998. The order of the names to be used was determined by placing the English name of the members in alphabetical order. Members of the committee are allowed to request the retirement or replacement of a system's name if it causes extensive destruction or for other reasons such as number of deaths.

Philippines

Since 1963, PAGASA has independently operated its own naming scheme for tropical cyclones that occur within its own self-defined Philippine Area of Responsibility. The names are taken from four different lists of 25 names and are assigned when a system moves into or develops into a tropical depression within PAGASA's jurisdiction. The four lists of names are rotated every four years, with the names of significant tropical cyclones retired if they have caused at least  in damage and/or at least 300 deaths within the Philippines; replacements to retired names are taken from the agency's list of reserved names. If the list of names for a given year are exhausted, names are taken from an auxiliary list, the first ten of which are published every year.

North Indian Ocean (45°E – 100°E)

Within the North Indian Ocean between 45°E – 100°E, tropical cyclones are named by the India Meteorological Department (IMD/RSMC New Delhi) when they are judged to have intensified into cyclonic storms with 3-minute sustained wind speeds of at least . If a cyclonic storm moves into the basin from the Western Pacific, then it will keep its original name. However, if the system weakens into a deep depression and subsequently reintensifies after moving into the region, then it will be assigned a new name. In May 2020, the naming of Cyclone Amphan exhausted the original list of names established in 2004. A new list of names has been prepared and will be used in alphabetical order for storms after Amphan.

South-West Indian Ocean (Africa – 90°E)

Within the South-West Indian Ocean in the Southern Hemisphere between Africa and 90°E, a tropical or subtropical disturbance is named when it is judged to have intensified into a tropical storm with winds of at least . This is defined as being when gales are either observed or estimated to be present near a significant portion of the system's center. Systems are named in conjunction with Météo-France Reunion by either Météo Madagascar or the Mauritius Meteorological Service. If a disturbance reaches the naming stage between Africa and 55°E, then Météo Madagascar names it; if it reaches the naming stage between 55°E and 90°E, then the Mauritius Meteorological Service names it. The names are taken from three pre-determined lists of names, which rotate on a triennial basis, with any names that have been used automatically removed. These names are then replaced by the WMO's RA I Tropical Cyclone Committee, with names submitted by member nations.

Australian region (90°E – 160°E)

Within the Australian region in the Southern Hemisphere between 90°E – 160°E, a tropical cyclone is named when observations or Dvorak intensity analysis indicate that a system has gale force or stronger winds near the center which are forecast to continue. The Indonesian Badan Meteorologi, Klimatologi, dan Geofisika names systems that develop between the Equator and 10°S and 90°E and 141°E, while Papua New Guinea's National Weather Service names systems that develop between the Equator and 10°S and 141°E and 160°E. Outside of these areas, the Australian Bureau of Meteorology names systems that develop into tropical cyclones. In order to enable local authorities and their communities in taking action to reduce the impact of a tropical cyclone, each of these warning centres reserve the right to name a system early if it has a high chance of being named. If a name is assigned to a tropical cyclone that causes loss of life or significant damage and disruption to the way of life of a community, then the name assigned to that storm is retired from the list of names for the region. A replacement name is then submitted to the next World Meteorological Organization's RA V Tropical Cyclone Committee meeting.

Indonesia
If a system intensifies into a tropical cyclone between the Equator – 10°S and 90°E – 141°E, it will be named by the Badan Meteorologi, Klimatologi, dan Geofisika (BMKG/TCWC Jakarta). Names are assigned in sequence from list A, while list B details names that will replace names on list A that are retired or removed for other reasons.

Papua New Guinea
If a system intensifies into a tropical cyclone between the Equator – 10°S and 141°E – 160°E, then it will be named by Papua New Guinea National Weather Service (NWS, TCWC Port Moresby). Names are assigned in sequence from list A and are automatically retired after being used regardless of any damage caused. List B contains names that will replace names on list A that are retired or removed for other reasons.

Australia

When a system develops into a tropical cyclone below 10°S between 90°E and 160°E, then it will be named by the Australian Bureau of Meteorology (BOM/TCWC Melbourne). The names are assigned in alphabetical order and used in rotating order without regard to year.

Southern Pacific Ocean (160°E – 120°W)

Within the Southern Pacific basin in the Southern Hemisphere between 160°E – 120°W, a tropical cyclone is named when observations or Dvorak intensity analysis indicate that a system has gale force or stronger winds near the centre which are forecast to continue. The Fiji Meteorological Service (FMS) names systems that are located between the Equator and 25°S, while the New Zealand MetService names systems (in conjunction with the FMS) that develop to the south of 25°S. In order to enable local authorities and their communities in taking action to reduce the impact of a tropical cyclone, the FMS reserves the right to name a system early if it has a high chance of being named. If a tropical cyclone causes loss of life or significant damage and disruption to the way of life of a community, then the name assigned to that cyclone is retired from the list of names for the region. A replacement name is then submitted to the next World Meteorological Organization's RA V Tropical Cyclone Committee meeting. The name of a tropical cyclone is determined by using Lists A — D in order, without regard to the year before restarting with List A. List E contains names that will replace names on A-D when needed.

South Atlantic Ocean
When a tropical or subtropical storm exists in the South Atlantic Ocean, the Brazilian Navy Hydrographic Center's Marine Meteorological Service names the system using a predetermined list of names. The names are assigned in alphabetical order and used in rotating order without regard to year. The name "Kurumí" replaced "Kamby" in 2018 without the latter being used.

See also

Tropical cyclone scales
Atlantic hurricane season
South Atlantic tropical cyclone
Pacific hurricane season
Pacific typhoon season
South Pacific tropical cyclone
North Indian Ocean tropical cyclone
South-West Indian Ocean tropical cyclone
Winter storm naming in the United Kingdom and Ireland
Australian region tropical cyclone
Regional Specialized Meteorological Center

Notes

References

External links
AskBOM: How do tropical cyclones get their names?
United States National Hurricane Center – RSMC Miami
United States Central Pacific Hurricane Center – RSMC Honolulu
Japan Meteorological Agency – RSMC Tokyo
India Meteorological Department – RSMC New Delhi
Météo-France – RSMC La Reunion
Indonesia Badan Meteorologi & Geofisika – TCWC Jakarta
Australia Bureau of Meteorology – TCWC Melbourne 
Fiji Meteorological Service – RSMC Nadi
Meteorological Service of New Zealand – TCWC Wellington
Brazilian Navy Hydrography Center – Marine Meteorological Service
Philippine Atmospheric, Geophysical and Astronomical Services Administration

 
Names
Tropical cyclones